"Perfect Week" is the 14th episode of the fifth season of the CBS situation comedy How I Met Your Mother and 102nd episode overall. It originally aired on February 1, 2010.

Plot
Future Ted starts off by explaining that Barney's way of dealing with stress was imagining he was being interviewed by CBS sportscaster Jim Nantz. Barney recaps his story, which began at MacLaren's a week ago when he "called his shot", pointing out a woman at the bar and saying she'd be the one he'd go home with that night. Thus began his attempt at a "perfect week", defined as having sex with seven women in seven days without a single rejection.

After four days, Barney's streak is unbroken, but on the fifth night, Marshall is worried because a big merger at work fell through and Barney was getting blamed for it. He said he thought Barney might get fired on Friday. Lily wants to talk to Barney, but Ted intervenes, and Barney asks him for help finding the dumbest girl in the bar, whom Barney promptly takes home.

Nantz asks Barney if he'd ever used performance-enhancing drugs, but says he hasn't. He said he'd been offered them before, and flashed back to a time when Marshall offered him some. He asked what time it was, then counted out four hours and realized he had to go to the hospital (indicating a priapism).

Barney returns to the apartment having already had sex with the sixth woman. Lily confronts him about losing his job, and utters the phrase "perfect week", jinxing Barney. The next night, Lily is so confident that Barney was going to score with Christy at the bar, she says "there's no such thing as a jinx." Then Nick Swisher, a member of the 2009 World Champion New York Yankees, walks through the door. Robin doesn't understand the appeal of a Yankee, so Lily compares it to the appeal of a Vancouver Canucks' player.

Christy starts to walk over to Nick Swisher and a dejected Barney comes over to the table complaining that his week was a waste and he was going to get fired the next day. Lily realizes they all needed Barney's perfect week to make them feel better. She gets up and trips in front of Christy. She asks Christy to get her some ice, and Marshall repeats that there is no such thing as a jinx. Wendy the Waitress then comes to bring the ice to Lily and Christy continues to walk towards Nick Swisher. Before she arrives, Marshall and Ted run to sit by Swisher, starting a conversation about sharing toothbrushes. Nick comments that he loves hockey, which appeals to Robin.

Barney goes to have sex with Christy and his interview with Jim Nantz ends. Barney is called into the office and his boss says he will be keeping his job. Back at the bar, the gang commemorates Barney's week by retiring the tie he wore on the seventh day.

Meanwhile, Robin goes on a bad date with a man called Dale but becomes insecure when he won't call her back. Ted laughs at a student's name ("Cook Pu") after assuming it was a fake name added to the roster as a prank, which leads her to drop the class. Marshall and Lily drive away another couple on a double date when they let slip that they use the same toothbrush. Ted and Robin soon realize they also, at one point, used that same brush.

Critical response

Donna Bowman of The A.V. Club rated the episode with a grade A−.

Brian Zoromski of IGN gave the episode 8.7 out of 10.

References

External links

How I Met Your Mother (season 5) episodes
2010 American television episodes